Cooplacurripa Station is a pastoral lease that operates as a cattle station in Cooplacurripa, New South Wales.

The Cooplacurripa River runs through the property, which is situated in a high rainfall valley area. It is one of the largest cattle stations on the eastern seaboard.

The Australian Agricultural Company has had links with the property dating back as far as 1846.

Over two years at a cost of 35,000 pounds he destroyed an estimated 500,000 rabbits; subsequently the property was soon able to support a herd of 10,000 cattle.

The  property was acquired by the Bydand Pastoral Company in 2003. The deal also involved the Australian Agricultural Company taking the stock and leasing the land for six years. The deal was worth 18.5 million.

The Bydand Pastoral Company placed the property on the market in 2012 for leasing when the property had an estimated carrying capacity of 9,000 head of cattle. The herd is a mix of Angus and Hereford cattle. Some 70 investors applied to manage the property at a cost of an estimated 1 million per year for a five-year lease. At the time the property had 11 cattle yards, extensive subdivision fencing, machinery and hay shed, cottages and the main homestead.

See also
List of ranches and stations

References

Pastoral leases in New South Wales
Stations (Australian agriculture)